The British space rock group Hawkwind have been active since 1969, but their earliest video release is Night Of The Hawk from their Earth Ritual Tour recorded at Ipswich on 9 March 1984. Since then, there have been numerous video releases covering the evolution of the band; some are professional broadcast shoots, others commercial, and a few are amateur.

There have also been some live video shoots of the band during the 1970s, although none have seen a commercial release. These include an early 12 April 1970 The Roundhouse, London performance and a Hawklords performance at Brunel University, Uxbridge on 24 November 1978.

The Hawkestra event, a reunion featuring appearances from all past and present members on 21 October 2000 at the Brixton Academy, was professionally filmed but disputes between band members would indicate any forthcoming release unlikely.

Promotional

Space Ritual
Tracks: "Silver Machine"; "Urban Guerilla"
Personnel: Robert Calvert – Vocals; Dave Brock – Guitar, Vocals; Lemmy – Bass, Vocals; Nik Turner – Flute, Saxophone; Del Dettmar – Electronics; Dik Mik – Electronics; Simon King – Drums; Stacia – Dancing
Recorded: Dunstable Civic Hall, 7 July 1972; Empire Pool, Wembley, 27 May 1973
Released: June 2007, EMI Remasters [2CD+DVD] 
Notes: "Silver Machine" recorded for the BBC television programme Top of the Pops. The live performances have been overdubbed with the studio tracks.

Live Videos

Night Of The Hawks
Tracks: "Ghost Dance"; "Watching The Grass Grow"; "Dream Worker"; "Ejection"; "Uncle Sam's On Mars"; "Martian Disco Stomp" [a.k.a. "The Iron Dream"]; "Brainstorm"; "Sonic Attack"; "The Island" [a.k.a. "Dust Of Time"]; "Brainstorm"; "Psi Power"; "Silver Machine"
DVD bonus tracks: "Night Of The Hawk" [Promo]
Personnel: Dave Brock – Guitar, Keyboards, Vocals; Harvey Bainbridge – Bass, Vocals; Huw Lloyd-Langton – Lead Guitar, Vocals; Dead Fred Reeves – Keyboards, violin; Nik Turner – Vocals, Sax; Clive Deamer – Drums
Recorded: Earth Ritual Tour, Ipswich, 9 March 1984 
Released: Jettisoundz, JE123 [VHS Tape]; Visionary, VISDVD005 [DVD]

Stonehenge 1984
Tracks: "Ghost Dance"; "Watching the Grass Grow"; "Utopia"; "Social Alliance"; "Uncle Sam's on Mars"; "Sonic Attack"; "The Right Stuff"; "Dawn"; "In The Morning"
20th Anniversary DVD Edition: "Ghost Dance"; "Angels of Death"; "Born To Go"; "Watching the Grass Grow"; "Night of the Hawks"; "Utopia"; "Social Alliance"; "Motorway City"; "Ejection"; "Uncle Sam's on Mars"; "Brainstorm"; "Sonic Attack"; "The Right Stuff"; "Dawn"; "In The Morning"
Personnel: Dave Brock – Guitar, Keyboards, Vocals; Alan Davey – Bass, Vocals; Huw Lloyd-Langton – Lead Guitar, Vocals; Harvey Bainbridge – Keyboards, Vocals; Nik Turner – Vocals, Sax; Danny Thompson Jr – Drums
Recorded: Stonehenge Festival, 20 June 1984 
Released: Visionary, JE250 [VHS tape]; Cherry Red, CRDVD056 [DVD]

The Chronicle Of The Black Sword
Tracks: "Song Of The Swords"; "Sea King"; "Master Of The Universe"; "Choose Your Masques"; "Needle Gun"; "Zarozinia"; "Lords Of Chaos"; "Brainstorm"; "Moonglum"; "Elric The Enchanter"; "Magnu"; "Horn Of Destiny" (a.k.a. "Horn Of Fate"); 
DVD bonus tracks:  "Coded Languages"; "Born To Go"; "Utopia"; "Levitation"; "Needle Gun" [Promo]
Personnel: Dave Brock – Guitar, Keyboards, Vocals; Alan Davey – Bass, Vocals; Huw Lloyd-Langton – Lead Guitar, Vocals; Harvey Bainbridge – Keyboards, Vocals; Danny Thompson Jr – Drums; Michael Moorcock – Vocals (guest); Tony Crerar – mime & dance; Kris Tait – mime & dance, vocals; Tim Pollard – mime
Recorded: Black Sword Tour, Hammersmith Odeon, 4 December 1985 
Released: Jettisoundz, JE150 [VHS tape]; Visionary, VVCD001 [Video CD]; Visionary, VISDVD002 [DVD]

Chaos
Tracks: "Magnu"; "Angels of Death"; "Assault and Battery"; "The Blood of Man"; "Master of the Universe"; "Dreaming City"; "Utopia"; "Brainstorm"; "Sonic Attack"; "Assassins of Allah" [a.k.a. "Hassan I Sabbah"]
Personnel: Dave Brock – Guitar, Keyboards, Vocals; Alan Davey – Bass, Vocals; Huw Lloyd-Langton – Lead Guitar, Vocals; Harvey Bainbridge – Keyboards, Vocals; Danny Thompson Jr – Drums
Recorded: Chaos tour, Preston, 3 December 1986.
Released: Visionary, JE287 [VHS Tape]; Cherry Red, CRDVD046 [DVD]

Treworgey Tree Fayre
Tracks: "Instrumental"; "Brainstorm"; "Down Through The Night"; "Treadmill"; "Time We Left (This World Today)"; "Assassins of Allah" [a.k.a. "Hassan I Sabbah"]; "Assault and Battery"; "Golden Void"; "Back in the Box"; "Arrival in Utopia"; "You Know You're Only Dreaming"; "Damnation Alley"; "Needle Gun"; "Ejection"; "Lost Chronicles"
Personnel: Bridget Wishart – Vocals; Dave Brock – Guitar, Keyboards, Vocals; Alan Davey – Bass, Vocals; Simon House – Violin; Harvey Bainbridge – Keyboards, Vocals; Richard Chadwick – Drums; Jerry Richards – guest guitar on 'Needle Gun'
Recorded: Treworgey Tree Fayre, 29 July 1989 
Released: Taste 3 [VHS tape]; 2008, Voiceprint Records, HAWKVP47DVD [DVD]
Note: This is amateur quality, shot from one fixed camera with the soundtrack recorded by the camera.
Steve Bemand (credited in press releases for the DVD as playing guest guitar did play with Hawkwind at the festival, contributing lead guitar for their later set on the Travelers' stage).

USA Tour 1989-1990
Disc 1: "Introduction"; "Needle Gun"; "The Golden Void"; "Check Control"; "Ejection"; "Brainstorm"; "Your Secret's Safe With Me"; "Wings""; "Out of the Shadows"; "Snake Dance"; "Night of the Hawks"; "Star Song"; "TV Suicide"; "Back in the Box"
Disc 2: "Master of the Universe"; "Assault and Battery"; "The Golden Void"; "Treadmill"; "Time We Left This World"; "Interview"; "Down Through The Night"; "Interview"; "Lost Chronicles"; "Needle Gun"; "Time We Left This World Today"; "Heads"; "Assassins of Allah"; "Images"; "Reefer Madness"
Personnel: Dave Brock – Guitar, Keyboards, Vocals; Alan Davey – Bass, Vocals; Richard Chadwick – Drums; Harvey Bainbridge – Keyboards
Recorded: USA tour, 1989–90
Released: 2008, Voiceprint Records, HAWKVP48DVD [2DVD]

Nottingham 1990
Tracks: "Assault and Battery"; "Golden Void"; "Out of the Shadows"; "Eons" [a.k.a. "Snake Dance"]; "Night of the Hawks"; "Back in the Box"; "Utopia"; "Ejection"; "Damnation Alley"; "Wind of Change" [VHS Tape bonus track]
Personnel: Bridget Wishart – Vocals; Dave Brock – Guitar, Keyboards, Vocals; Alan Davey – Bass, Vocals; Simon House – Violin; Harvey Bainbridge – Keyboards, Vocals; Richard Chadwick – Drums
Recorded: Lenton Lane Studios, Nottingham, 25 January 1990. 
Released: Castle Communications, CMP6005 [VHS tape]; Classic Rock, CRL1558 [DVD PAL] CRL1559 [DVD NTSC] 
Note: This is a professional shoot originally made for broadcast on ITV's Bedrock series of concerts.

Bournemouth Academy
Tracks: "Angels of Death"; "Golden Void"; "instrumental"; "Acid House Of Dreams" [a.k.a. "Dream Worker"]; "You Shouldn't Do That"; "Out Of The Shadows"; "Seventh Star"; "Night Of The Hawks"; "Back In The Box"; "Arrival In Utopia"; "Images"; "Assassins Of Allah" [a.k.a. "Hassan I Sabbah"]; "Brainstorm"; "Ejection"
Personnel: Bridget Wishart – Vocals; Dave Brock – Guitar, Keyboards, Vocals; Alan Davey – Bass, Vocals; Harvey Bainbridge – Keyboards, Vocals; Richard Chadwick – Drums
Recorded: Bournemouth Academy, 2 July 1990 
Released: Taste 19 [VHS tape] 
Note: This is amateur quality, shot from one fixed camera with the soundtrack recorded by the camera.

Brixton Academy
Tracks: "Out Of The Shadows"; "Right To Decide"; "7 By 7"; "The Right Stuff"; "Spirit Of The Age"; "The Iron Dream"; "Secret Agent"; "Assassins Of Allah" [a.k.a. "Hassan I Sabbah"]; "Golden Void"; "LSD"; "Blue Shift"; "Brainstorm"; "Psi Power"; "Time We Left (This World Today)"; "Master Of The Universe"; "Welcome To The Future"
Personnel: Dave Brock – Guitar, Keyboards, Vocals; Alan Davey – Bass, Vocals; Richard Chadwick – Drums; Salt Tank – Synths
Recorded: Brixton Academy, 15 August 1992 
Released: Taste 33 [VHS tape] 
Note: This is amateur quality, shot from one fixed balcony camera (Sony 8mm) with the mono soundtrack recorded on that camera, mixed with the footage of a roving (S-VHS) camera, at front of house.

Love In Space
Tracks: "Abducted"; "Death Trap"; "Wastelands" [a.k.a. "Wastelands Of Sleep"]; "Are You Losing Your Mind?"; "Photo Encounter"; "Blue Skin"; "Sputnik Stan"; "Robot"; "Alien"; "Xenomorph"; "Vega"; "Love In Space"; "Kapel"; "Elfin"; "Silver Machine"; "Welcome To The Future"; "Assassins Of Allah" [a.k.a. "Hassan I Sabbah"/"Space Is Their (Palestine)"]
Personnel: Ron Tree – Vocals; Dave Brock – Guitar, Keyboards, Vocals; Alan Davey – Bass, Vocals; Richard Chadwick – Drums; 
Recorded: Alien 4 Tour, 1995 
Released: Visionary JE290 [VHS Tape]; Cherry Red, CRDVD035 [DVD]
Notes: Also released as the double CD Love in Space.

Out Of The Shadows
Tracks: "Earth Calling"/"Aerospace-Age Inferno"; "Angels Of Death"; "Out Of The Shadows"; "Time Captives"; "Master Of the Universe"; "Song Of The Gremlin"; "Time/Confusion"; "Hurry On Sundown"; "Lighthouse"; "The Watcher"; "Assassins Of Allah" [a.k.a. "Hassan I Sabbah"/"Space Is Their (Palestine)"]; "Earth Calling"/"You Shouldn't do That"; "Sonic Attack"/"Spacebrock"; "Silver Machine"
Personnel: Dave Brock – Guitar, Keyboards, Vocals; Alan Davey – Bass, Vocals; Richard Chadwick – Drums; Huw Lloyd Langton – Lead Guitar; Tim Blake – Keyboards, Vocals; Arthur Brown – Guest Vocals 
Recorded: Newcastle Opera House, 4 December 2002 
Released: Secret Records, SECDVD110 [DVD]

Winter Solstice 2005
Tracks: "The Right Stuff"; "Sword of the East"; "Greenback Massacre"; "Out Here We Are"; "Angela Android"; "Love in Space"; "Paradox"; "Spirit of the Age"; "Psi Power"; "Assassins of Allah"; "Brainstorm"; "Psychedelic Warlords"; "Brainbox Pollution"
Personnel: Dave Brock – Guitar, Keyboards, Vocals; Alan Davey – Bass, Vocals; Richard Chadwick – Drums; Jason Stuart – Keyboards; Jez Huggett – guest saxophone
Recorded: Astoria Theatre, London, 21 December 2005
Released: 2008, Voiceprint Records, HAWKVP44DVD [DVD]
Note: This is amateur quality, shot from one fixed camera.

Space Melt
Tracks: "Right Stuff"; "Psychedelic Warlords"; "Dogstar"; "Orgone Accumulator"; "Paradox"; "Robot"; "Out Here We Are"; "Greenback Massacre"; "Marine Snow"; "Lord Of Light"; "Images"; "Infinity"; "Assassins of Allah" [a.k.a. "Hassan I Sabbah"/"Space Is Their (Palestine)"]; "Motorhead"
Personnel: Dave Brock – Guitar, Keyboards, Vocals; Alan Davey – Bass, Vocals; Richard Chadwick – Drums; Jason Stuart – Keyboards
Recorded: Magna, Rotherham, 18 December 2006 
Released: 
Notes: Private release for fan club members only.

Knights of Space
Tracks: "Black Corridor"; "Aero Space Age Inferno"; "Space Love"; "The Awakening"; "Orgone Accumulator"; "Paradox"; "Robot"; "Abducted"; "Alien (I Am)"; "Alien Poem"; "Master of the Universe"; "Time We Left"; "Lighthouse"; "Arrival in Utopia"; "Damnation Alley"; "Sonic Attack"; "Welcome to the Future"; "Flying Doctor"; "Silver Machine"
Personnel: Dave Brock – Guitar, Keyboards, Vocals; Mr Dibs – Bass, Vocals; Richard Chadwick – Drums; Jason Stuart – Keyboards; Tim Blake – Keyboards, theremin
Recorded: Astoria Theatre, London, 19 December 2007
Released: 2008, EntertainME [DVD]
Notes: Also released as the double CD Knights of Space.

Space Ritual Live
Tracks: "Seasons"; "Steppenwolf"; "Utopia"; "Opa Loka"; "Spiral Galaxy"; "Reefer Madness"; "Sentinel"; "Spirit of the Age"; "Earth Calling"; "Born to Go"; "Down Through The Night"; "Poem 1st Landing"; "Lord of Light"; "Poem Black Corridor"; "Space Is Deep"; "A Step Into Space"; "Orgone Accumulator"; "Upside Down"; "10th Second of Forever"; "Brainstorm"; "Seven By Seven"; "Sonic Attack"; "Time We Left"; "Master of the Universe"; "Welcome to the Future"; "Silver Machine"
Personnel: Dave Brock - Guitar, Vocals; Mr Dibs - Bass, Guitar, Vocals; Richard Chadwick - Drums, Vocals; Dead Fred - Keyboards, Violin; Tim Blake - Theremin, Synth; Niall Hone - Bass, Guitar, Vocals; John Etheridge - Lead Guitar, Brian Blessed - Vocals
Recorded: O2 Shepherd's Bush, London, 22 February 2014
Released: 2015, Gonzo Media [DVD] Deluxe set
Notes: Also released as the double CD Space Ritual Live

Various Artists

Stonehenge 84
Tracks: Roy Harper: "One Man Rock'n'Roll Band"; "Commune"; "I Hate The White Man"; "Highway Blues"; Hawkwind: "Ghost Dance"; "Angels Of Death"; "Watching the Grass Grow"; "Utopia"; "Social Alliance"; "Brainstorm"; The Enid: "Sunrise"; "Song For Europe"; "Something Wicked This Way Comes"; "Wild Thing"
Personnel: Dave Brock – Guitar, Keyboards, Vocals; Alan Davey – Bass, Vocals; Huw Lloyd-Langton – Lead Guitar, Vocals; Harvey Bainbridge – Keyboards, Vocals; Nik Turner – Vocals, Sax; Danny Thompson Jr – Drums
Recorded: Stonehenge Festival, 20 June 1984 
Released: Visionary, JE134 [VHS tape]

Bristol Custom Bike Show
Tracks: Hawkwind – "Master of the Universe"; Voodoo Child – "Lost In Heart"
Personnel: Dave Brock – Guitar, Keyboards, Vocals; Alan Davey – Bass, Vocals; Huw Lloyd-Langton – Lead Guitar, Vocals; Harvey Bainbridge – Keyboards, Vocals; Danny Thompson Jr – Drums
Recorded: Bristol Custom Bike Show, 20 June 1986 
Released: Jettisoundz, JE164 [VHS tape]

References

Hawkwind